James Spencer (born 22 April 1936) is a British cross-country skier. He competed in the men's 30 kilometre event at the 1956 Winter Olympics.

References

1936 births
Living people
British male cross-country skiers
Olympic cross-country skiers of Great Britain
Cross-country skiers at the 1956 Winter Olympics
Place of birth missing (living people)